Sorèze is a commune in the Tarn department in southern France.

See also 
 Communes of the Tarn department

References

External links 

 Sorèze website (in French)
 Abbey-school of Sorèze (in French)

Communes of Tarn (department)